Chasing the Deer (later re-titled Culloden 1746) is a 1994 British war film directed by Graham Holloway and starring Brian Blessed, Lewis Rae, Iain Cuthbertson, Fish and Mathew Zajac. It depicts the 1745 Jacobite Rebellion, in which Bonnie Prince Charlie landed in Scotland, trying to claim the British throne.

The title metaphorically alludes to the Jacobites as the quarry in a deer hunt. The phrase "a-chasing the deer" appears in the refrain of the romantic Scottish poem by Robert Burns, My Heart's in the Highlands (1789).

Plot
In the time leading up to Jacobite rising of 1745, a young Highlander called Euan (Lewis Rae) and his father Alistair are press-ganged into the Jacobite army to fight for the Young Pretender, Bonnie Prince Charlie.

Euan's group of warriors are captured by Hanoverian loyalist troops and he is forced to join the Duke of Cumberland's army as a drummer for the British. Major Elliot (Brian Blessed), a Hanoverian officer who has lost his own son, forms a protective relationship with Euan. Father and son end up fighting on opposing sides at Culloden. Euan is killed, and Alistair runs to his aid. Seeing a Jacobite soldier standing over the body of his favourite soldier, Major Elliot kills Alistair.

Production

The budget for Chasing the Deer was limited, and in order to raise money for the production, the filmmakers crowdfunded the film by inviting individuals to invest £1000 each in the project. In return for their contributions, the 374 investors were allowed to appear in the film as extras.

For the battle scenes, notably the depiction of the Battle of Culloden, the filmmakers engaged a Scottish battle reenactment group, the Scottish Clan Battle Society, to perform historical combat. The group also performed in other Scottish historical films such as Highlander (1985) and Braveheart (1995).

Chasing The Deer was filmed on location in Scotland, including Culloden, Fort George, Kingussie, Ruthven Barracks, and the Cairngorm mountains. Some internal sequences were filmed in England at Hagley Hall in Worcestershire, and battle scenes at the nearby Wychbury Hill.

Music
The film soundtrack includes music by the Scottish celtic rock group Runrig and the ex-Marillion singer-songwriter Fish, and  features the song "Battle Lines" by the English rock musician John Wetton.

Cast
Brian Blessed as Major Elliot
Iain Cuthbertson as Tullibardine
Matthew Zajac (as Mathew Zajac) as Alistair Campbell 
Fish as Angus Cameron
Brian Donald as Old Campbell
Sandy Welch as Old Cameron
Peter Gordon as McKinnon
Carolyn Konrad as Morag
Lynn Ferguson as Shonagh
Lewis Rae as Euan
Simon Kirk as Sgt. Kirk
Andy McCullogh as Sgt. Monroe
Callum McDougal as a Crofter
Steven Cooper as a Crofter
Michael Leighton as O'Sullivan
Dominique Carrara as Charles Edward Stuart
Robert McIntosh as McDonald of Sleat
Jacqueline Pirie as Mary
Jock Ferguson as Lord George Murray (general)

Reception
Murray Pittock's critical assessment of Chasing the Deer considered that Holloway's production was influenced by Peter Watkins's 1964 film Culloden in its portrayal of the conflict as a clash between haphazard, tribal Jacobite warriors and the forces of modernity. 
However, Time Out contrasted  Chasing the Deer unfavourably with Watkins's film for its small cast and over-reliance on a smoke machine, but singled out Brian Blessed's performance for praise.  Writing in the Glasgow Herald, William Russel found the script and acting style clumsy and the cinematography unimaginative and restricted. However, he also praised Brian Blessed's portrayal of Major Elliot, the choreography of the battle scenes and the choice of "stunningly beautiful" Highland locations. Empire awarded the film two stars out of five, citing the low-budget production values and the use of "Tourist Board footage of lush countryside and antlered animals in order to fill gaping holes in the plot." Chasing the Deer has been credited with helping to raise cultural awareness of the historical events at Culloden.

External links

References

1994 films
British war drama films
English-language Scottish films
Jacobite rising of 1745 films
Crowdfunded films
Fiction set in 1746
Films shot in Highland (council area)
Films set in the 1740s
1990s war drama films
1990s historical films
Scottish films
1994 drama films
1990s English-language films
1990s British films